Christen Knudsen (25 January 1813 - 7 April 1888) was a Norwegian ship-owner.

Personal life
Christen Knudsen was born in 1813 at Salterød near Arendal. He moved to Porsgrunn in 1855.

He married Guro Aadnesdatter (1808-1900), later spelt "Gurine Aanonsen". The couple had three children. Their sons Jørgen Christian Knudsen and Gunnar Knudsen both became wealthy ship-owners and influential politicians: Jørgen Christian as mayor and parliament member, Gunnar as Prime Minister of Norway. Their only daughter Serine married Johan Jeremiassen and had a political career of her own, starting even before women's suffrage was introduced.

Career
Having moved to Porsgrunn, the ship business flourished. As a ship-owner he owned a considerable fleet, of which fourteen ships was built at his own shipbuilding yard. Together with P. M. Petersen and son-in-law Johan Jeremiassen he was described as one of "the three large ship-owners of the city". He was also a navy captain. On the mainland, he invested in real estate.

A ship belonging to his son Gunnar was named Christen Knudsen, but this was sunk by the Kaiserliche Marine in 1916.

References

1813 births
1888 deaths
People from Arendal
People from Porsgrunn
Norwegian businesspeople in shipping